The 13th Regiment Illinois Volunteer Cavalry was a cavalry regiment that served in the Union Army during the American Civil War.

Service
The original eight companies of the  13th Illinois Cavalry was mustered into service at Camp Douglas between October 30, 1861, and February 20, 1862.
Surviving members of the regiment were consolidated into a battalion of three companies on May 20, 1863.  Seven new companies were added to the regiment in February, 1864.

The regiment was mustered out on August 31, 1865.

Total strength and casualties
The regiment suffered 21 enlisted men who were killed in action or who died of their wounds and 4 officers and 360 enlisted men who died of disease, for a total of 385 fatalities.

Commanders
 Colonel Joseph W. Bell - mustered out May 20, 1863.
 Colonel Albert Erskine

See also
List of Illinois Civil War Units
Illinois in the American Civil War

Notes

References
The Civil War Archive

Units and formations of the Union Army from Illinois
1861 establishments in Illinois
Military units and formations established in 1861
Military units and formations disestablished in 1865